Roberto Galindo Sánchez (born 14 October 1980) is a Bolivian footballer who plays a centre forward.

Honours
Jorge Wilstermann
 Liga de Futbol Profesional Boliviano: 2000

External links
 
 
 

1980 births
Living people
Sportspeople from Cochabamba
Bolivian footballers
Bolivia international footballers
Association football forwards
C.D. Jorge Wilstermann players
Club Aurora players
La Paz F.C. players
Club Blooming players
The Strongest players
Universitario de Sucre footballers
Oriente Petrolero players
Nacional Potosí players